Lars Anders Amble-Næss (10 August 1939 – 20 August 2015) was a Swedish actor and director. Amble was the son of Leif Amble-Næss and Maritta Marke. After finishing theater school in Stockholm, which he attended from 1962 to 1965, he was hired by the Royal Dramatic Theater until 1969, after which he has played parts in various theater plays, musicals, TV shows and movies.
From 1986 to 1994 he was artistic director for the Maxim theater in Stockholm.

He died of cancer one week and three days after his 76th birthday.

Selected filmography
 Heja Roland! (1966)
 The Corridor (1968)
 Father to Be (1979)
 Illusive Tracks (2003)

References

External links

1939 births
2015 deaths
Male actors from Stockholm
Swedish theatre directors
Litteris et Artibus recipients
Deaths from cancer in Sweden